Lake Chatuge is a man-made reservoir in Towns County, Georgia, and Clay County, North Carolina. It lies along the Hiwassee River created by the Chatuge Dam which finished construction in 1942. Lake Chatuge is the highest major lake in the state of Georgia.

See also
List of dams and reservoirs in the United States

References

Protected areas of Clay County, North Carolina
Protected areas of Towns County, Georgia
Reservoirs in North Carolina
Reservoirs in Georgia (U.S. state)
Bodies of water of Clay County, North Carolina
Bodies of water of Towns County, Georgia